Simón Santana is a Norwegian–Spanish fighter who competes in the featherweight division. He has competed in the Enfusion, KOK and GLORY promotions. He started learning karate at 7 years old and competed until he was 17 years old. At age 17, he switched to kickboxing and Thai boxing. He began fighting in amateur and semi-pro matches before turning professional. He had a quick progression and became the Spanish champion in professional kickboxing in 2008.

He owns the Santana Kickboxing/K1 Club.

Titles
Professional
 2008 Spanish Master in proffesional Kickboxing
 2015 Oslo Fight Night Champion
 2015, 2016 Norwegian Champion in Thai boxing
 2016 WKN Full Contact Featherweight World Champion
 2018 WBC MT Pro Scandinavian Master

Kickboxing record 

|-  bgcolor="#FFBBBB"
| 2022-05-07 || Loss ||align=left| Markko Moisar || KOK 100 World Series in Tallinn || Tallinn, Estonia || TKO || 2 || 
|-
! style=background:white colspan=9 |
|-  

|-  style="background:#fbb;"
| 2019-08-24|| Loss||align=left| David Mejia (kickboxer) ||FEA World GP Odessa   || Odessa, Ukraine ||  Decision (Unanimous) || 3 || 3:00

|-  style="background:#FFBBBB;"
| 2019-05-25|| Loss ||align=left| Wei Rui || Glory of Heroes 38: Shantou || Guangdong, China || Decision (Unanimous) || 3 || 3:00
|-  bgcolor="#CCFFCC"
| 2018-10-13 || Win ||align=left| Markko Moisar || King Of Kings 60 || Tallinn, Estonia || KO (Low Kicks) || 2 || 1:23 
|-
|-  bgcolor="#FFBBBB"
| 2018-06-09 || Loss ||align=left| Christopher Shaw || Enfusion || Staffordshire, England || Decision (unanimous) || 3 || 3:00
|-
|-  bgcolor="#FFBBBB"
| 2017-04-29 || Loss ||align=left| Mohammed El-Mir || Glory 40: Copenhagen || Copenhagen, Denmark || Decision (unanimous) || 3 || 3:00 
|-
|-  bgcolor="#FFBBBB"
| 2016-11-12 || Loss ||align=left| Cristian Spetcu || SUPERKOMBAT World Grand Prix 2016 Final || Bucharest, Romania || Decision (unanimous) || 3 || 3:00
|-
! style=background:white colspan=9 |
|-  
|-  bgcolor="#FFBBBB"
| 2016-10-08 || Loss ||align=left| Jesus Romero || Enfusion Live Madrid, Semi Final|| Madrid, Spain || Decision (unanimous) || 3 || 3:00
|-
|-  bgcolor="#CCFFCC"
| 2016-10-08 || Win ||align=left| Roberto Alario || Enfusion Live Madrid, Quarter Final|| Madrid, Spain || Decision (unanimous) || 3 || 3:00
|-
|-  bgcolor="#CCFFCC"
| 2016-05-21 || Win ||align=left| Jonathan Pastorino || Full Contact Night || Nice, France || Decision (unanimous) || 12 || 2:00
|-
! style=background:white colspan=9 |
|- 
|-  bgcolor="#FFBBBB"
| 2015-07-11 || Loss ||align=left| Ilias Bulaid || Enfusion Live #30 || Dublin, Ireland || KO (knee to the head) || 1 || 1:07
|-
! style=background:white colspan=9 |
|-  
|-  bgcolor="#CCFFCC"
| 2014-06-29 || Win ||align=left| Jose Varela || Enfusion Live London || London, England || KO (Right Cross) || 1 || 2:36
|-  bgcolor="#FFBBBB"
| 2011-01-08 || Loss ||align=left| Zeben Diaz || K-1 Max Madrid || Madrid, Spain || Decision (unanimous) || 3 || 3:00
|-
|-
| colspan=9 | Legend:

See also 
List of male kickboxers

References

External links
Profile at Glory World Series

Living people
Norwegian male kickboxers
Spanish male kickboxers
Lightweight kickboxers
Welterweight kickboxers
Norwegian Muay Thai practitioners
Spanish Muay Thai practitioners
Glory kickboxers
Year of birth missing (living people)
SUPERKOMBAT kickboxers